Make Me a Millionaire Inventor is an American television docu-series which airs on CNBC, and has been called "a sort-of Mythbusters-meets-Shark-Tank mashup." The show's two hosts, George Zaidan and Deanne Bell, are "on a mission to find the best inventions NEVER made and give them new life." Each episode features Zaidan and Bell (a chemist/advisor and mechanical engineer, respectively) teaming up with two sets of inventors who have "hit a brick wall," to help them prepare their inventions for a pitch to potential investors who can help take them to market.

The original version of the show aired in the UK in 2013 on Sky Vision, and the rights to the show were sold to a number of other providers worldwide.

Broadcast
The series premiered in America on CNBC on August 12, 2015, with episodes airing every Wednesday. A second season launched on October 6, 2016.

Episodes

Series overview

Season 1 (2015)

Season 2 (2016)

References

External links

2015 American television series debuts
2016 American television series endings
CNBC original programming
English-language television shows